Ann Marie Starr (born 1992) is a camogie player, a member of the Galway senior panel that unsuccessfully contested the All Ireland finals of 2010 and 2011 against Wexford.

Other awards
All Ireland Club Championship 2011. Minor club title, Connacht  schools medal 2009.

References

External links
 Camogie.ie Official Camogie Association Website

1992 births
Living people
Galway camogie players